Firebases in the U.S.-Afghanistan War, are a type of military base, usually fire bases.

It may refer to:

 Firebase Anaconda, Uruzgan province; involved in the Battle of Firebase Anaconda
 Firebase Fiddler's Green, Helmand Province
 Gardeyz Firebase, Paktia Province
 Firebase Lilley, Paktika Province
 Firebase Phoenix, Kunar Province
 Firebase Tinsley (Firebase Cobra) Oruzgan Province
 Firebase Wilderness, Paktia Province

See also
 Firebase Bell, northern Iraq

War in Afghanistan (2001–2021)-related lists
Military units and formations of the War in Afghanistan (2001–2021)